Råbelövsbanan was former racing circuit in Kristianstad, Scania, Sweden. The circuit was named after the Råbelöv Castle.

History

The circuit was opened on 14 September 1952. It hosted World Sportscar Championship in 1956–1957, and Grand Prix motorcycle racing races in 1959 and 1961. Besides the world championship races, the circuit also hosted Skåneloppet motorcycle races between 1952 and 1956.

After the 1961 Swedish motorcycle Grand Prix, the circuit was closed and no races were held.

Winners

World Sportscar Championship

Grand Prix motorcycle racing

† Race did not count towards the World Championship.

Lap records

The official race lap records at the Rabelövsbanan are listed as:

References

Defunct motorsport venues
Motorsport venues in Sweden
Grand Prix motorcycle circuits
Buildings and structures in Skåne County
Sport in Skåne County